Jalese Gordon (born 8 November 2001) is an Antigua and Barbuda sailor. She competed in the Laser Radial event at the 2020 Summer Olympics.

References

External links
 

2001 births
Living people
Antigua and Barbuda female sailors (sport)
Olympic sailors of Antigua and Barbuda
Sailors at the 2020 Summer Olympics – Laser Radial
Pan American Games competitors for Antigua and Barbuda
Sailors at the 2019 Pan American Games
Place of birth missing (living people)